Juliana de Almeida e Oyenhausen, also known as Julia Stroganova, (1782–1864), was a Portuguese noble and lady in waiting. Born to Leonor de Almeida Portugal, 4th Marquise of Alorna and Carlos Pedro Maria José Augustus, Count of Oyenhausen-Groewenbourg, she was the official mistress of Jean-Andoche Junot, the regent of French-occupied Portugal in 1807-1808, and exerted political influence during her position as such.

She married Aires José Maria de Saldanha Albuquerque Coutinho Matos e Noronha, 2nd Count of Ega, in 1800, and later married Count Grigory Alexandrovich Stroganoff, a high-ranking member of Russian nobility. Their daughter, Idaliya Grigorievna Straganova, was born before her parents married in 1826. Idaliya, who married major-general Aleksandr Mikhailovich Poletika, was a close friend of her second cousin Natalia Pushkina.

Ancestry

1782 births
1864 deaths
19th-century Portuguese people
Portuguese nobility